Research chemicals are chemical substances used by scientists for medical and scientific research purposes. One characteristic of a research chemical is that it is for laboratory research use only; a research chemical is not intended for human or veterinary use. This distinction is required on the labels of research chemicals, and is what exempts them from regulation under parts 100-740 in Title 21 of the Code of Federal Regulations (21CFR).

Background

Pharmacological research chemicals

Research chemicals are fundamental in the development of novel pharmacotherapies. Common medical laboratory uses include in vivo and animal testing to determine therapeutic value, toxicology testing by contract research organizations to determine drug safety, and analysis by drug test and forensic toxicology labs for the purposes of evaluating human exposure. Many pharmacologically active chemicals are sold online under the guise of "research chemicals," when in reality they are untested designer drugs that are being sold for recreational use despite the compounds' transitional or unclear legal status.

Agricultural research chemicals
Research agrochemicals are created and evaluated to select effective substances for use in commercial off-the-shelf end-user products. Many research agrochemicals are never publicly marketed. Agricultural research chemicals often use sequential code names.

See also
 Pharmaceutical industry
 Prices of chemical elements
 Experimental drug
 Investigational New Drug
 Experimental cancer treatment
 Quantum chemistry
 Controlled Substances Act
 List of designer drugs
 Designer drug

References

Drug culture
Drug discovery
Harm reduction
Medicinal chemistry